Tease Me is an album by Jamaican reggae duo Chaka Demus & Pliers, released in 1993 by Mango Records. It peaked at number one on the UK Albums Chart and was a one-hit wonder there. All six singles from the album were top 40 hits in the UK, with "Twist and Shout" reaching number one on the UK Singles Chart.

Track listing
Songs written by John Taylor (Chaka Demus), Everton Bonner (Pliers), Lloyd Willis, Sly Dunbar and Robbie Shakespeare, unless otherwise noted.

"Tease Me"
"She Don't Let Nobody" (Curtis Mayfield, Dino Fekaris)
"Nuh Betta Nuh Deh"
"Bam Bam" (Frederick Hibbert)
"Friday Evening"
"Let's Make It Tonight"
"One Nation Under a Groove" (Gary Shider, George Clinton, Walter Morrison)
"Tracy"
"Sunshine Day"
"Murder She Wrote" (Bonner, Taylor, Willis, Dunbar)
"Roadrunner"
"I Wanna Be Your Man"
"Twist and Shout" (Phil Medley, Bert Berns)
"Gal Wine"

Charts

References

1993 albums
Chaka Demus & Pliers albums